Alexander Gingsjö (born 23 December 1980) is a Swedish road cyclist. He competed at the 2014 UCI Road World Championships.

Major results

2011
 2nd Road race, National Road Championships
 5th Scandinavian Race Uppsala
2012
 1st Stage 1 Baltic Chain Tour
2013
 1st Scandinavian Race Uppsala
2014
 1st  Time trial, National Road Championships
2015
 1st  Road race, National Road Championships
 1st Stage 3 Baltic Chain Tour

References

1980 births
Swedish male cyclists
Living people
Place of birth missing (living people)
20th-century Swedish people
21st-century Swedish people